The 1993 Montenegrin championship season was the unofficial futsal competition in Montenegro, during the time period of FR Yugoslavia. Championship was organised by clubs who supported the independence of Montenegro, but the results of league and final ranking were not recognised by Montenegrin Football Association.

Year before was held 1992 Montenegrin Championship in football but, because of conditions, Montenegrin independent championship became futsal league from season 1993.

Championship played in period February - November in 1993.

Members
Previous season: 1992 Montenegrin Championship

In the Montenegrin independent championship 1993 participated 7 self-organized futsal clubs from municipalities of Cetinje, Kotor, Nikšić and Podgorica. 

KMF Cetinje - Cetinje
KMF Crnogorac - Kotor
KMF Onogošt - Nikšić
KMF Gorica - Podgorica
KMF Boka - Kotor
KMF Crnogorac - Cetinje
KMF Nikšić - Nikšić

Venues

The competition was held at several school sport halls in Cetinje, Kotor and Podgorica. Few matches played on open air fields. Clubs from Nikšić played home games in Podgorica and Cetinje.

Conditions

Due to the tense political situation in Montenegro, the championship was played without media attention. A lot of games have been played in secret.

See also
Montenegrin independent championship (1992-1999) 
Montenegrin